Dunnville Airport  was a registered aerodrome located  south of Dunnville, Ontario, Canada. It was built during World War II as part of the British Commonwealth Air Training Plan and was home to Royal Canadian Air Force No.6 Service Flying Training School, which opened on 25 November 1940 and closed on 1 December 1944.   There is a museum at the airport commemorating the training school.

In 2003 the airport was designated a National Historic Civil Engineering Site by the Canadian Society of Civil Engineers. On 30 May 2013, all flight operations ceased at the airport to make way for industrial wind turbines.

The former airport is privately owned, but the public is welcome at the museum. There are five aircraft hangars and several buildings dating from the 1940s on the site. There are two public mini-storage buildings, one being large enough to store recreational vehicles and other large vehicles indoors. Canada's Worst Driver has been filmed here since its sixth season.

Former tenants

 Maylan Aviation
 Niagara Skydiving Centre

References

External links
Page about this airport on COPA's Places to Fly airport directory

Canadian Forces bases in Canada (closed)
Defunct airports in Ontario
Airports of the British Commonwealth Air Training Plan